DHQD may refer to:
 Dihydroquinidine, a chemical compound
 3-dehydroquinate dehydratase, an enzyme